Afrozavrelia is a genus of European non-biting midges in the subfamily Chironominae of the bloodworm family Chironomidae that are closely related to Zavrelia.

Species
A. kribiensis (Kieffer, 1923)

References

Chironomidae
Diptera of Africa